Jashar Mehmet Pasha was a citizen of Pristina and also the mayor of Skopje in 1842.

He built the Jashar Pasha Mosque in 1834.

References

Politicians from Pristina
Mayors of Skopje